Mera Shikaar is a 1988 Indian Hindi action film directed by Keshu Ramsay. The film stars Dimple Kapadia, Kabir Bedi in lead roles. Dialogues of this movie became a hit and therefore audio cassettes of dialogue were released. It was written by Iqbal Durrani. Subhash Jha of The Indian Express called the film "extraordinarily adroit entertainer" "one of the most engaging action films", and wrote, "with daring defiance, the film snowballs ideas that challenge its common objective (elemental entertainment). It would be a pity if the film is lumped with the run-of-the-mill potboiler." He further wrote that "unlike Zakhmi Aurat it does not degenerate into sleazy sensationalism". Referring to the transformation of Bijli, he wrote, "The metamorphosis of the frisky Bijli into the ferocious fighter is achieved in the film with unusual restraint through smooth editing, crisp camerawork cuttingly ironic dialogues, and of course Dimple's trevails both physical and cerebral."

Cast
 Dimple Kapadia as Bijli
 Kabir Bedi as Ravi
 Prem Chopra as Bhurelal
 Danny Denzongpa as Changeza
 Trilok Kapoor as Mukhiya
 Om Shivpuri as Gafoor
 Navin Nischol as Masterji (Special Appearance)

Music

References

External links

1988 films
1980s Hindi-language films
Films scored by Bappi Lahiri
Films directed by Keshu Ramsay
Indian action films